The World Jewish Congress lawsuit against Swiss banks was launched in 1995 to retrieve deposits made into Swiss banks by victims of Nazi persecution during and prior to World War II. Initiated as WJC negotiations with both the Government of Switzerland and its banks over burdensome proof-of-ownership requirements for accounts, strong support from United States politicians and leaked documents from a bank guard pressured a settlement in 1998 in a U.S. court for multiple classes of people affected by government and banking practices. As of 2015, US$1.28 billion  has been disbursed for 457,100 claimants.

Negotiations
Starting in 1995, the World Jewish Congress (WJC) began negotiations on behalf of various Jewish organizations with Swiss banks and the Swiss government over dormant Jewish World War II bank accounts. Led by Edgar Bronfman, the heir to the Seagram's fortune, the WJC entered a class-action in Brooklyn, New York City combining several established suits in New York, California, and the District of Columbia. The original suits arose from grievances of Holocaust survivors and their heirs against Swiss banks. They alleged improper difficulties in accessing these accounts because of requirements such as death certificates (typically non-existent for Holocaust victims), along with deliberate efforts on the part of some Swiss banks to retain the balances indefinitely. The causes for claims eventually expanded to include the value of art works purported to have been stolen, damages to persons denied admission to Switzerland on the strength of refugee applications, and the value or cost of labor performed by persons being maintained at Swiss government expense in displaced-person camps during the Holocaust, along with interest on such claims from the time of loss. Plaintiffs included all Holocaust victims, not just Jews.

Hearings
The WJC was able to marshal the unprecedented support of U.S. government officials including senator Alfonse D'Amato R-NY, who held hearings of the Senate Banking Committee in which he claimed to possess "recently declassified documents that shed new light" on the Swiss role in the war.  He also claimed that "hundreds of millions of dollars" of war-era Jewish assets remained in Swiss banks.  At the behest of President Bill Clinton, Undersecretary of Commerce Stuart Eizenstat testified at these hearings and commissioned a report which accused Switzerland of being "Nazi Germany's banker." The report relied exclusively on U.S. government archives.  It contained no new historical information on Nazi victims' deposits into Swiss banks, and criticized the decisions of U.S. officials who negotiated settlements with Switzerland after the war as being too lenient.  Christoph Meili, a Swiss bank guard, also testified at the hearings, claiming to have witnessed illegal shredding of wartime records at Union Bank of Switzerland (SBG/UBS) in January 1997.  He removed wartime records of transactions with German companies and gave them to the Swiss-Israeli Cultural Association. A warrant was issued for his arrest for violation of banking secrecy laws, and he fled to the U.S.. UBS claimed the records were not relevant to dormant Jewish assets.

US–Swiss tension
The hearings led to international friction between the US and Switzerland, with boycotts of Swiss companies and products threatened in several US states. In Switzerland, the most controversial contention of the Eizenstat report was that Switzerland assisted the Nazis beyond what was necessary for a neutral country, and prolonged the war.  Swiss public opinion was overwhelmingly against any settlement.  The banks' position was that the settlement demands were grossly out of proportion to the value of unclaimed assets, and the Swiss government's position was that negotiations relating to laundering of assets looted by the Nazis were settled during previous agreements with the Allied governments and could not be reopened, because no new historical information had come to light.

Audits of dormant accounts ordered by the Swiss government in 1962 and 1995 showed a total of $32 million (1995 dollars) in unclaimed war-era accounts.
In 1997, the banks published a list of dormant accounts in newspapers abroad. Among the names, then American ambassador, Zurich-born Madeleine Kunin, found Renee May, her mother, who died in 1970.

The WJC rejected initial offers from the banks and demanded payment of $1.8 billion to settle the lawsuit.  During the negotiations, the Swiss banks agreed to pay for another audit—headed by ex Federal Reserve chairman Paul Volcker—of wartime accounts.  This audit committee consisted of three representatives from the banks, and three representatives from the Jewish groups.  NY City Comptroller Alan G. Hevesi played a crucial role in the negotiations, convening a meeting in December 1997 with Swiss bank executives and Democratic Party state treasurers to discuss sanctions such as divesting state funds from Swiss banks and withholding licenses.  Hevesi also withheld an operating license for the merger of Union Bank of Switzerland with Swiss Bank Corporation, who together made $4 billion in profits per year in New York City.  Author Angelo Codevilla argues that this was essentially blackmail of the banks by state banking officials, with backing of the US administration, to force a settlement between the banks and the WJC.  Negotiations involving the banks, the WJC, and Undersecretary Eizenstat ultimately resulted in a settlement of $1.25 billion in August 1998.  The Swiss government refused to take part in the settlement, and started a CHF 300 million Special Fund for Holocaust Victims with the Swiss National Bank.  It also commissioned an independent panel of international scholars known as the Bergier Commission to study the relationship between Switzerland and the Nazi regime.

Volcker and Bergier commissions

The Volcker commission audit cost CHF 300 million and gave its final report in December 1999.  It determined that the 1999 book value of all dormant accounts possibly belonging to victims of Nazi persecution that were unclaimed, closed by the Nazis, or closed by unknown persons was CHF 95 million.  Of this total, CHF 24 million were "probably" related to victims of Nazi persecution. In addition the commission found "no proof of systematic destruction of records of victim accounts, organized discrimination against the accounts of victims of Nazi persecution, or concerted efforts to divert the funds of victims of Nazi persecution to improper purposes." It also "confirmed evidence of questionable and deceitful actions by some individual banks in the handling of accounts of victims". The Volcker commission recommended that for settlement purposes, the book values should be modified back to 1945 values (by adding back fees paid and subtracting interest) and then be multiplied by 10 to reflect average long-term investment rates in Switzerland. Under these rules, a total of $379.4 million was awarded to account holders or their heirs.  In cases where the claimant could be verified but the size of the account could not, a $125,000 award was given.  The commission recommended that the remaining balance of the settlement should be given to other victims of Nazi persecution.  The Bergier Commission reached similar conclusions about the banks' conduct in its final report, and found that trade with Nazi Germany did not significantly prolong World War II.

Settlement

On November 22, 2000, Judge Edward R. Korman announced a settlement of this case with his approval of a plan featuring the payment of $1.25 billion into funds controlled by the Israeli Banking Trust. Judah Gribetz was appointed Special Master to administer the plan, which is sometimes called the Gribetz Plan after its chief author.

As of December 31, 2015, US$1.28 billion has been disbursed for 457,100 claimants.

See also

Alperin v. Vatican Bank
Bank secrecy
Banking in Switzerland
Gold laundering
List of banks in Switzerland
Swiss National Bank (Switzerland's central bank)
UBS AG (Switzerland's largest bank)
Credit Suisse (Switzerland's second largest bank)
List of class action lawsuits
Nazi gold
Numbered bank account
Private bank
Switzerland during the World Wars

References

Holocaust charities and reparations
Banking in Switzerland
Law of Switzerland
Jewish Swiss history
Class action lawsuits
Switzerland in World War II